A drain is the primary vessel or conduit for unwanted water or waste liquids to flow away, either to a more useful area, funnelled into a receptacle, or run into sewers or stormwater mains as waste discharge to be released or processed.

In most systems, the drain is for discharge of waste fluids, such as the drain in a sink in which the water is drained when it is no longer needed. In the UK, plumbers refer to waste water as "bad water", under the premise that the water they are moving from one area to another via the use of a drain is not needed and can be removed from the area, like a "bad apple" being removed from a fruit bowl.

Design, installation, and maintenance
Drain design and installation parameters are engineered to ensure drain functionality for its intended purpose, allowing for variances in volume, matter to be conveyed and maintenance requirements. Drain installation takes into account principles related to gravity, vacuum, grade, health hazards from biological agents, and resistance to functional failure. Also incorporated in drain design are requirements to allow drain maintenance and repair of a blocked drain, such as cleanout access.

Safety

Swimming pools and fountains
In systems such as swimming pools or fountains where waste fluid is recirculated, the drain is the input to the recirculating pumping machine. These fixtures can be very dangerous because people do not expect to encounter more than the head pressure of water above the drain when contacting a drain. When there is a recirculating pump, the force of suction consists of the head of water, plus the suction of the pump (up to a maximum of 1 atmosphere).

Fatalities have occurred around drains as a result of suction entrapment (also known as pool suction-drain injury).  In these situations, a portion of the body, hair, or clothing may become stuck against the drain and may become impossible to release, resulting in drowning.  For example, in 1994, Cristin Fitzpatrick drowned in a Variety Village swimming pool when her hair became entangled in a water funnel.

Properly designed drains in swimming pools and spas mitigate this hazard by either adding multiple drains, or increasing the surface area of the drain opening with the use of many holes or safety covers.  Since drain suction increases rapidly when a portion of the drain flow is blocked, having two drains or a larger drain inlet allows alternative suction paths for the inflow. Also, swimming pool safety devices are available to automatically turn off an operating pump if a rapid increase in suction is detected, as could happen during a suction entrapment incident.

While fear of the drain may be counterproductive, children should be taught not to intentionally touch or attempt to block components of a swimming pool recirculation system.

Since children often play in public fountains, the use of multiple drains is a mandatory safety feature, regardless of whether or not the architect or planner intends that the fountain be used as an aquatic play feature.  This is to ensure minimal risk of plumbing entrapment, but vandals can sometimes break into drains in the night time and remove the covers (commonly known as "drain mugging"), leaving them in a hazardous condition.

Legislation
On December 17, 2007, the national Virginia Graeme Baker Pool and Spa Safety Act was passed into law in the US. This law seeks to bring an end to suction entrapment related injuries and deaths by incorporating consumer protection regulation of pool and spa drains.

Drain covers
A drain cover is a cover with holes (e.g. a manhole) or a grating used to cover a drain, to prevent unwanted entry of foreign objects, or injury to people or animals. It allows drainage of liquids but prevents entry from large solid objects, and thus acts as a coarse filter. A sink drain cover is a drain cover used to cover the sink drain.

Maintenance

Blocked drains are a common problem in bathrooms and kitchens. In some cases, a chemical drain cleaner can clear the blockage, or a drain snake or augur can be used to mechanically clear the blockage. Disassembly of drain pipes can be an effective method of clearing severe blockages, especially if caused by the presence of a solid object. Sometimes, a licensed plumber is needed to rectify more fundamental issues with the installation. Blocked drains, if left long enough, can develop into a health hazard as the presence of mold and bacteria increases.

Standards
The American Society of Mechanical Engineers publishes the following standards:
A112.6.3 – Floor and Trench Drains
A112.6.4 – Roof, Deck, and Balcony Drains

See also

 Domestic water system
 Drain (HVAC)
 Drainage system (disambiguation)
 Piping and plumbing fitting
 Plumbing
 Plumbing drainage venting
 Septic system
 Sewage collection and disposal
 Trench drain (Channel drain)

References

Plumbing
Drainage